Vladimír Neff (13 June 1909, Prague – 2 July 1983, Prague) was a popular Czech writer and translator. He wrote numerous historical novels, political satires and parodies on criminal stories and adventure tales.

He is best known for his historical novels, especially the pentalogy Reasonable marriages, Emperor's violets, Mean blood, The happy widow and The royal charioteer (Sňatky z rozumu, Císařské fialky, Zlá krev, Veselá vdova a Královský vozataj) and the satirical pseudo-historical trilogy depicting the travels and adventures of an imaginary nobleman Petr Kukaň z Kukaně (Peter Coop from Coop) consisting of the books Queens have no legs, The ring of the Borgias and The beautiful sorceress (Královny nemají nohy, Prsten Borgiů a Krásná čarodějka).

He was the father of the contemporary publicist and science-fiction writer Ondřej Neff.

See also
 List of Czech writers

1909 births
1983 deaths
Czech novelists
Male novelists
Czech male writers
Czech translators
20th-century translators
20th-century novelists
20th-century male writers
Writers from Prague
Burials at Vyšehrad Cemetery